Dysoptus denticulatus is a species of moth in the family Arrhenophanidae. It is known only from Brazil, São Paulo, Boracéia Field Station, and Casa Grande.

The length of the forewings is about 5 mm for males. Adults are on wing in February (based on one record).

Etymology
The specific name is derived from the Latin denticulatus (with small teeth), in reference to the denticulate apex of the saccular process in the male valva.

References

External links
Family Arrhenophanidae

Dysoptus
Taxa named by Donald R. Davis (entomologist)
Moths described in 2003